Jenn McGinn (born in Charlottetown, Prince Edward Island) is a Canadian politician, who was elected to the Legislative Assembly of British Columbia, representing the electoral district of Vancouver-Fairview, in a by-election on October 29, 2008. She is the first openly lesbian MLA to serve in the British Columbian Legislature. A member of the British Columbia New Democratic Party, her candidacy was endorsed in a Georgia Straight editorial.

McGinn is an account manager with the community business banking team of Vancity Savings Credit Union. She is a former vice-president of Little Mountain Neighbourhood House and past executive director of the South Granville Seniors Centre. She was also the director of development for the Surrey Women's Centre. McGinn first became involved in politics as a high school student in Charlottetown in the late 1980s. She was 17 when she joined the party, and soon became president of the P.E.I. Young New Democrats.

After the 2008 by-election the provincial constituency of Vancouver-Fairview was redistributed by Elections BC as part of a larger provincewide redistribution. She was defeated by BC Liberal candidate Margaret MacDiarmid in the 2009 provincial election.

Electoral record

|-
 
|NDP
|Jenn McGinn
|align="right"|5,487
|align="right"|46.66
|align="right"|

|-

|-

|-

|}

References

External links 
 Jenn McGinn

British Columbia New Democratic Party MLAs
Canadian LGBT people in provincial and territorial legislatures
Lesbian politicians
Living people
People from Charlottetown
Politicians from Vancouver
Women MLAs in British Columbia
Year of birth missing (living people)
21st-century Canadian politicians
21st-century Canadian women politicians
21st-century Canadian LGBT people